Roosevelt J. Roberts (born August 24, 1989) is a former professional Canadian football defensive end who is currently a free agent. He played college football at Troy University.

College career 

Roberts played for the Troy Trojans from 2007-2011. He spent a year as a redshirt in 2008 for academic eligibility reasons, and another year as a redshirt in 2010. In early 2011, he was dismissed from the program due to an unspecified violation of team rules. Between the 2007 and 2009 seasons, he accumulated 14 tackles and one blocked kick.

Professional career 

In 2011, Roberts played for the Saskatchewan Roughriders of the CFL. He recorded one tackle in a CFL game before being injured during the season and released later that year.

Roberts played in 10 games for the Tampa Bay Storm of the AFL in 2013. He recorded 27 tackles, three sacks, two forced fumbles, and three fumble recoveries.

Roberts was signed as a free agent to the Edmonton Eskimos on April 28, 2015.

Roberts appeared in 1 game for the Massachusetts Pirates in the 2019 season. Roberts recorded 1 sack on the year.

References 

1989 births
Living people
African-American players of American football
African-American players of Canadian football
Edmonton Elks players
Saskatchewan Roughriders players
Canadian football defensive linemen
Players of American football from Alabama
American football defensive linemen
Troy Trojans football players
Tampa Bay Storm players
People from Enterprise, Alabama
Hudson Valley Fort players
Massachusetts Pirates players
Philadelphia Soul players
21st-century African-American sportspeople
20th-century African-American people